Patcha Point is the south end of Nansen Island in Wilhelmina Bay, off the west coast of Graham Land. Charted by the Belgian Antarctic Expedition under Gerlache, 1897–99. Named by the United Kingdom Antarctic Place-Names Committee (UK-APC) in 1960 for Jan Patcha, helicopter pilot with the Falkland Islands and Dependencies Aerial Survey Expedition (FIDASE) which photographed this area in 1956–57.

Headlands of Graham Land
Danco Coast